Jambyl  is a 1953 Soviet drama film directed by Efim Dzigan.

Plot
The film tells about the life and work of the famous singer of the Kazakh people, bard Jambyl Jabayev.

Cast
 Shaken Ajmanov as Jambyl 
 Kurmanbek Dzhandarbekov as Kadyrbay  
 G. Kurmangaliyev  
 German Khovanov 
 Kapan Badyrov 
 Kh. Abugaliyeva as Alma  
 Nurmukhan Zhanturin 
 Kenenbai Kozhabekov
 Konstantin Adashevsky as Governor  
 Yefim Kopelyan
 Semyon Derevyansky 
 A. Dzhalumbetov  
 Erast Garin 
 Olesya Ivanova 
 Yevgeny Lebersky 
 A. Lukinov  
 Vasili Merkuryev 
 Nina Nikitina as Teacher  
 Zhagda Oguzbayev 
 A. Tashev  
 N. Topalova  
 Yeleubai Umurzakov as Suyumbay  
 Amina Umurzakova

References

Bibliography 
 Borys Levitsky. Who's who in the Soviet Union: a biographical encyclopedia of 5,000 leading personalities in the Soviet Union. K.G. Saur, 1984.

External links 
 

1953 films
1950s biographical drama films
1950s Russian-language films
Soviet biographical drama films
1953 drama films
Soviet black-and-white films